Celetrigona is a genus of bees belonging to the family Apidae.

Species:

Celetrigona euclydiana
Celetrigona hirsuticornis
Celetrigona longicornis

References

Apidae
Bee genera